The Communist Party of Canada - Marxist-Leninist (CPC (M-L)) ran fifty-one candidates in the 1993 federal election, none of whom were elected.  Information about these candidates may be found here.

List of candidates

Ontario (incomplete)

References